Red Book, Redbooks, Little Red Book or Big Red Book may refer to:

Political pamphlets 
 Little Red Book, common name for the pocket-size edition of Quotations from Chairman Mao Tse-tung
 The Little Red Schoolbook,  published in Denmark in 1969
 Red Book (Liberal Party of Canada), policy platform for the 1993 election
 Red Book (Albania), memorandum for the autonomy of Albania
 The Charter of the Malagasy Socialist Revolution (the Red Book, Malagasy: Boky Mena), published in 1975 by Didier Ratsiraka

Reference books and standards

Medicine and health care
 The Little Red Book (Alcoholics Anonymous), a study guide
 AAP Red Book, pediatric infectious diseases
 Personal Child Health Record, used by the National Health Service of the United Kingdom
 Red Book, a drug reference published by Thomson Reuters
 Red Book, nickname for the Statement of Fees and Allowances, adopted by the UK General medical services in 1990 and abolished in 2004
 Red Book, US guide to prescription medicines published by Thomson, including data such as average wholesale price

Science and computers 
 IUPAC Red Book, nomenclature of inorganic chemistry
 IUPAP Red Book, of symbols, units, nomenclature, and fundamental constants in physics
 Red Book, alternate name for NTIA Manual of Regulations and Procedures for Federal Radio Frequency Management, technical regulations relating to electromagnetic frequency spectrum
 Red Book, a series of recommendations published by the CCITT (now ITU-T) in 1956–1964, and in 1984
 Red Book, a British computer networking protocol from the 1980s, one of the Coloured Book standards
 Red Book, a.k.a. Trusted Network Interpretation, part of the Rainbow Series by the National Computer Security Center
 Red Book, American name for one of the Japanese naval codes during World War II
 The Red Book, alternate name for the 8th edition of the OpenGL Programming Guide
 The Red Book, alternate name for the 3rd edition of the PostScript Language Reference
 The Red Book, one of the Rainbow Books, outlining the standard for Compact Disc Digital Audio, originally produced in 1980 by the format's joint creators, Sony and Philips

Other reference 
Red Book, nickname for A Guide Book of United States Coins by R. S. Yeoman, an overview and pricing guide
 Red Book, US guide for risk assessment by National Research Council
 Red Books, plans for landscape gardens by British designer Humphry Repton
 Redbooks, alternative name for firefighter training manuals published by the International Fire Service Training Association 
 The Red Book, alternate name for the RICS Appraisal and Valuation Standards, the professional guidelines for real estate valuers in the United Kingdom
 The Redbook: A Manual on Legal Style by Bryan A. Garner
 AAUP Policy Documents and Reports, a.k.a. the Redbook, by the American Association of University Professors
 Iowa Official Register, a biannual publication of Iowa government and history
Red Book, a model contract for construction by the Federation Internationale des Ingenieurs-Conseil (FIDIC)

Lists of endangered entities 
 Red Book of Endangered Species, international listing (since 1948)
 Regional Red List, regional or country equivalents
 Red Data Book of the Russian Federation, a list of endangered and protected species, prohibited for hunting, in Russia and most CIS states
 The Red Book of the Peoples of the Russian Empire (1991)
 Red Book of Endangered Languages, a comprehensive list of the world's languages facing extinction (2009)
 Red Book of Ukraine, a list of endangered animals and plants that live in Ukraine

Manuscripts 
 Red Book of the Exchequer, a 13th-century manuscript in England
 Red Book of Hergest, a medieval Welsh manuscript
 The Red Book (Jung), manuscript of Carl Gustav Jung
 Red Book of Clanranald, on clan history, literature, and poems

Music 
 Red Book (album), 2005 album by Texas
 "My Little Red Book", song by Burt Bacharach and Hal David
 My Little Red Book of Winners, album by Manfred Mann
 "My Little Red Book", song recorded by Manfred Mann that appeared in the 1965 film What's New Pussycat?
 Little Red Songbook, a 1909 song book published by the Industrial Workers of the World

Other uses 
 Harvard Redbook, 1945 report on the role of general education in American secondary schools, also known as General Education in a Free Society
 Redbook, an American women's magazine
 Red Book of Westmarch, a fictional manuscript written by Hobbits, a conceit of author J. R. R. Tolkien to explain the source of his stories
 Monty Python's Big Red Book, a humour book first published in 1971
 The Red Book (film), 1994 experimental film
 Red Book (C&S), nickname for the first edition of the Chivalry & Sorcery role-playing game
 Red Book of Varieties and Schemes, lecture notes by mathematician David Mumford on the theory of schemes
 The Beige Book, a report on the state of the US economy by the United States Federal Reserve Board, was known as the Red Book from 1970 to 1983
 Xiaohongshu (literally 'Little Red Book'), a Chinese social media and e-commerce platform created in 2013

See also
 Black Book (disambiguation)
 Blue book
Blue Book (disambiguation)
 Green Book (disambiguation)
 Orange Book (disambiguation)
 Pink Book (disambiguation)
 Plum Book
 White book (disambiguation)
 Yellow Book (disambiguation)